American singer Nicole Scherzinger has released two studio albums, and twenty-eight singles (including ten as a featured artist, one promotional single and three charity singles). She came into prominence in the early 2000s as a member of the ill-fated girl-group Eden's Crush and then was cast as the lead singer of the Pussycat Dolls, a burlesque troupe turned-recording group. She has sold over 60 million records as a solo artist and as a member of the Pussycat Dolls.

During the hiatus of the Pussycat Dolls, Scherzinger planned to release her debut album, Her Name is Nicole in 2007. After two years of projected release dates and four singles—"Whatever U Like", Baby Love", "Supervillain", and "Puakenikeni"—failed to make any significant impact on the Billboard charts, led Scherzinger to cancel the project and shifted back her focus to the Pussycat Dolls. In 2009, Scherzinger collaborated with A. R. Rahman on a pop version of "Jai Ho" entitled "Jai Ho! (You Are My Destiny); the song was a worldwide success, reaching number one in 17 countries including in Australia.

Following the group's disbandment, Scherzinger released her debut studio album, Killer Love (2011). A moderate success, the album debuted at number 8 on the UK Albums Chart and produced the singles "Poison", "Don't Hold Your Breath", "Right There", "Wet" and "Try with Me" which was included on the reissue. The second single "Don't Hold Your Breath" topped the UK Singles Chart, while third single "Right There" became the singer's highest charting single on the Billboard Hot 100 as a solo artist. Scherzinger's second studio album, Big Fat Lie was released through RCA Records in October 2014. The album was preceded by the singles "Your Love", "Run" and "On the Rocks".

Studio albums

Singles

As a lead artist

Featured singles

Charity singles

Promotional singles

Other charted songs

Songwriting discography

See also
 List of songs recorded by Nicole Scherzinger
 Nicole Scherzinger videography

Notes

References

External links
[ Discography of Nicole Scherzinger] at Allmusic

Nicole Scherzinger
Discographies of American artists
Pop music discographies